Ribar is both a surname and a given name. As a surname, in Croatian, Macedonian, and Bulgarian languages it literally means "fisherman".

Notable people with the name include:

Frank Ribar
Ivan Ribar
Ivo Lola Ribar
Ribar Baikoua

See also
 
Rebar

Croatian surnames
Bulgarian-language surnames
Occupational surnames